Ronald Louis "Ron" Hansis (born November 12, 1952, in Brownsville, Texas) is a former professional ice hockey player who played 100 games in the World Hockey Association. He played for the Houston Aeros.

Hansis was the long-time coach of the Erie Panthers of the East Coast Hockey League. He was named the inaugural recipient of the John Brophy Coach of the Year Award after the 1988–89 ECHL season, and was named to the league's 2nd All-Star Team after the next year. When the Panthers were moved to Baton Rouge, he was fired eleven games into the 1997-98 ECHL season.

His daughter, Taylor, pitches at Georgia Gwinnett College while his son, Donald, plays right field at Spartanburg Methodist College (as of 2019). Another daughter, Carly, played outfielder at the College of Charleston from 2013 to 2016.

References

External links 
 
 

Living people
1952 births
American men's ice hockey forwards
American ice hockey coaches
Concordia Stingers ice hockey players
Oklahoma City Blazers (1965–1977) players
Houston Aeros (WHA) players
Broome Dusters players
Erie Blades players
Rochester Americans players
Fort Wayne Komets players
Muskegon Mohawks players
Nashville South Stars players
Erie Golden Blades players
Ice hockey people from Texas
People from Brownsville, Texas